The 1964 Kilkenny Senior Hurling Championship was the 70th staging of the Kilkenny Senior Hurling Championship since its establishment by the Kilkenny County Board. The championship began on 3 May 1964 and ended on 1 November 1964.

St. Lachtain's were the defending champions, however, they were beaten by Bennettsbridge in the second round. Rower-Inistioge were promoted to the championship.

On 1 November 1964, Bennettsbridge won the championship after a 4-09 to 1-04 defeat of Glenmore in the final at Nowlan Park. It was their ninth championship title overall and their first title in two championship seasons.

Team changes

To Championship

Promoted from the Kilkenny Junior Hurling Championship
 Rower-Inistioge

Results

First round

Second round

Semi-finals

Final

References

Kilkenny Senior Hurling Championship
Kilkenny Senior Hurling Championship